The 2003 Nasarawa State gubernatorial election occurred in Nigeria on April 19, 2003. The PDP nominee Abdullahi Adamu won the election, defeating Aliyu Doma of the All Nigeria Peoples Party.

Abdullahi Adamu emerged PDP candidate. He picked Labaran Maku as his running mate. Aliyu Doma was the ANPP candidate with Chris Abashi as his running mate.

Electoral system
The Governor of Nasarawa State is elected using the plurality voting system.

Primary election

PDP primary
The PDP primary election was won by Abdullahi Adamu. He picked Labaran Maku as his running mate.

ANPP primary
The ANPP primary election was won by Aliyu Doma. He picked Chris Abashi as his running mate.

Results
A total number of 8 candidates registered with the Independent National Electoral Commission to contest in the election.

The total number of registered voters in the state was 852,626. Total number of votes cast was 741,590, while number of valid votes was 726,127. Rejected votes were 15,463.

References 

Nasarawa State gubernatorial elections
Nasarawa State gubernatorial election
Nasarawa State gubernatorial election
Nasarawa State gubernatorial election